This article highlights the rosters and teams which participated in the 1981 European Women Basketball Championship, commonly called EuroBasket Women 1981, held by FIBA Europe. The competition took place in Italy from 13 September to 20 September 1981. Soviet Union won the gold medal and Poland the silver medal while Czechoslovakia won the bronze.

Group A













Group B













References

External links
 FIBA Archive

EuroBasket Women 1981
EuroBasket Women squads